Bing Lee is an Australian retailing company, a chain of superstores specialising in consumer electronics, computer and telecommunication goods.  Bing Lee is the largest privately held electrical retail business in New South Wales with 41 stores (13 franchised) and a turnover of about $490 million.

History 
The business began when Bing Lee (Chinese: 李冰, Pinyin: lǐ bīng) purchased an electrical repair business in Fairfield, New South Wales, in 1957. Lee, along with his son Ken Lee & Cedric Lee (Chinese: 李光裕, Pinyin: lǐ guāng yù), transformed the repair business into an electrical product retail and repair/installation business named Bing Lee Electronics (Chinese: 并力电器, Pinyin: bìng lì diàn qì). Initial growth came from the surge in demand for televisions, as well as a host of other household items like washing machines, cooking equipment, heaters and audio equipment. Bing Lee was a member of Retravision NSW for a number of years before leaving and joining the Narta Group. Bing Lee opened new stores in other Sydney suburbs and across New South Wales.

Founder Bing Lee died in 1987 (aged 79) and Ken Lee was appointed Chairman. Ken Lee died on 21 December 2007 of cancer (aged 75). His eldest son Lionel Lee took over as chief executive of the company.

Today, 16 of the 40 Bing Lee retail outlets are run by franchisees after franchising was introduced within the business in the early 2000s. Bing Lee has also held the management rights to the "Sony Centre" concept in NSW and the ACT, later closing those stores.

Sponsorships 

Bing Lee sponsors Sydney FC, and the Sydney Swans, and had sponsored the Canterbury Bulldogs (until allegations of player involvement in sexual assaults).

They also sponsored Seven Network's The Amazing Race Australia.

References

External links
 

Consumer electronics retailers of Australia
Retail companies established in 1957
Companies based in Sydney
Australian companies established in 1957